Anders Samuelsen (born 1 August 1967 in Horsens, Denmark) is a Danish former politician who served as the Minister of Foreign Affairs from 2016 to 2019, member of the Folketing from 2007 to 2011 and as leader of the Liberal Alliance party from 2009 to 2019.

In 1993, Samuelsen got a master's degree in political science from Aarhus University. From 1994 to 1998, he was a consultant and section manager at the College for the Deaf, Castberggård

Political career

European Parliament
From 2004 until 2007, Samuelsen was a Member of the European Parliament sitting on the European Parliament's Committee on Budgets. As member of the European Parliament, he was a substitute for the Committee on Foreign Affairs, a member of the Delegation for relations with Iran and a substitute for the Delegation for relations with the People's Republic of China.

Career in Danish politics
Samuelsen is a former member of the Danish Social Liberal Party, and was a Member of the Bureau of the Alliance of Liberals and Democrats for Europe. He left this party on 7 May 2007, became one of the three founding members of the Liberal Alliance and was elected to the Danish parliament for Liberal Alliance in the 2007 election.

By late 2016, Samuelsen threatened to bring down the government of Prime Minister Lars Løkke Rasmussen because of disagreements over tax cuts, immigration and welfare policies. In September 2016, he announced that his party was ready to file a motion of no confidence if Rasmussen failed to cut the top rate of income tax by 5 percentage points in the 2017 budget. In response, Rasmussen reshuffled his cabinet to have the Liberal Alliance join the government and take the leadership of six ministries.

Minister of Foreign Affairs

Under Samuelsen's leadership, the government won parliamentary approval in January 2017 to deploy up to 60 special forces to fight Islamic State in Syria as part of the U.S.-led Operation Inherent Resolve. The government later committed to sending an additional 55 soldiers to the NATO-led Resolute Support Mission in Afghanistan; the decision was made to boost security efforts after a car bomber attacked a Danish convoy in September 2017.

Following his party's poor results at the 2019 general election, Samuelsen was publicly accused of nepotism by fellow party member Henrik Dahl. Due to Samuelsen failing at getting reelected, he resigned as party leader on 6 June 2019.

Other activities
 Asian Infrastructure Investment Bank (AIIB), Ex-Officio Member of the Board of Governors

 2017 : Grand Cross of the Order of the Crown

See also
List of foreign ministers in 2017
List of current foreign ministers

References

External links

 
 
 
 

1967 births
Danish Social Liberal Party MEPs
Foreign ministers of Denmark
Government ministers of Denmark
Liberal Alliance (Denmark) MEPs
Living people
MEPs for Denmark 2004–2009
Aarhus University alumni
People from Horsens
Grand Crosses of the Order of the Crown (Belgium)
Members of the Folketing 2001–2005
Members of the Folketing 2007–2011
Members of the Folketing 2011–2015
Members of the Folketing 2015–2019
Leaders of political parties in Denmark